Monster Camp is a 2007 documentary film that chronicles a live action role-playing game organization. Monster Camp looks at the lives of the participants, and considers the pro and cons of escapism through fantastical outlets. Freedom State director Cullen Hoback documents the fantasy world, following several participants over the course of one year.

The group followed is a Seattle, Washington chapter of NERO Alliance (now Alliance LARP), one of many live-action role-playing organizations in the US.  Players create their own identities selecting from a variety of races and classes, similar to Dungeons and Dragons or World of Warcraft. Participants dress up and are involved as either player characters, non-player character, or Plot Members.

It premiered at the Cinequest Film Festival 17 in 2007, where it received the Audience Award for Best Documentary. Monster Camp screened at the Seattle International Film Festival and the Corvallis da Vinci Film Festival. According to the film's site, it has screened in approximately 40 film festivals around the world.

Production 
The film was shot largely at Millersylvania State Park in Washington State.  While shooting, temperatures in the region dropped below zero degrees.  The main weekend chronicled in the film occurred during the coldest temperatures recorded in the Northwest in 50 years.  Many of the costumes worn by characters during this filming were abnormal.  The lower temperatures during filming made it impractical to wear purely character specific clothing.

The film's score is done by California band, Speechwriters LLC.

See also
 Darkon
 Trekkies

References 

 "Monster Camp: The Story Of Nero Seattle" by Dennis Harvey in Variety
 "Monster Camp" by Felix Vasquez Jr. for Film Threat. 4 out of 5 stars.
 "Monster Camp" by Dennis Schwartz for Ozus' World Movie Reviews. "B" rating.
 "Today schedule" by Moira Macdonald for The Seattle Times. 3 out of 4 stars.
 "A monster hit for Boston film fest" by Brian Jewell for Bay Windows.
 "They are their toughest critics" by Brandy Hilboldt Allport for the Florida Times Union. 
 "Monster Camp: Interview with Director Cullen Hoback" by Jon Bosworth for the EU Jacksonville

External links

 
 
 
 

2007 films
American documentary films
Live-action role-playing games
2000s English-language films
2000s American films